Dolores Probert Kuenz is a former international table tennis player from the United States.

Table tennis career
She won a World Championship gold medal in the Women's Team event at the 1937 World Table Tennis Championships known as the Corbillon Cup. she was the captain of the team.

Hall of Fame
She was inducted into the USA Hall of Fame in 1979.

See also
 List of table tennis players
 List of World Table Tennis Championships medalists

References

American female table tennis players
World Table Tennis Championships medalists
20th-century American women